The Parish Church of la Asunción is a Catholic church located in the Painter Segrelles Square number 14, in the municipality of Albaida (Valencian Community), Spain. It is good of local relevance with ID number 46.24.006-008.

History 
The parish was stablished in the 13th century. The building was built between 1592 and 1621 in Valencian Gothic style, replacing the old church of our Lady of the Assumption, built in the 13th century. It was restored in 1830.

Description 
The church consists of a single nave, with chapels between the buttress. The facade stands out for its simplicity and its two Renaissance doors. The slender bell tower square was used as a watch tower until an auction was added in the middle of 19th century. Inside, in the chapels, sculptures in Baroque Revival architecture style of Gallarza, the imperial bed of our Lady of August (17th century) and the baptismal are marble (18th century).

There are a set of oil paintings by Josep Segrelles in the altar (17th century). Segrelles also are paintings of religious scenes of Albaida between the arches of the chapels and cornice of the ship, as well as the paintings of the chapel Real of the communion, adjacent building from the 19th century. The sacristy retains several luxurious ornaments from the 15th to the 20th centuries, highlighting the true cross, a reliquary of Gothic silverware, possibly from the 15th century.

See also 

Route of the Valencian classics

External links 

File at Valencian Heritage Library

Roman Catholic churches in the Valencian Community
Buildings and structures in Albaida
Bien de Interés Cultural landmarks in the Province of Valencia